Paulo Sérgio de Oliveira (born 10 May 1989), commonly known as Paulinho, is a Brazilian footballer who plays as a defensive midfielder for Santa Cruz.

Club career
Born in Francisco Morato, São Paulo, Paulinho was an Internacional youth graduate. He made his first team – and Série A – debut on 30 November 2008, coming on as a substitute for Rosinei in a 1–0 home win against Cruzeiro.

On 12 May 2009, Paulinho was loaned to Figueirense in the Série B, until the end of the year. The following February, he moved to Guarani also in a temporary deal.

On 19 July 2011, after a short stint at Botafogo-SP, Paulinho joined Ponte Preta. After appearing rarely, he signed for Guaratinguetá in February of the following year.

On 19 December 2012, Paulinho agreed to a contract with Ituano. A regular starter, he was crowned champions of the Campeonato Paulista in 2014, after defeating Santos.

On 8 May 2014, Paulinho signed for Náutico, and contributed with three goals in 25 appearances for the side. On 23 December, he returned to Ponte Preta.

Paulinho again featured sparingly for the club, and was subsequently released; on 9 July 2015, he joined Criciúma. The following 4 January he moved to Paysandu, but cut ties with the club on 6 June after appearing rarely.

Paulinho started the 2017 campaign with Mirassol, but returned to Criciúma in April. On 5 July, however, he signed with Atlético Goianiense until the end of the year.

An immediate mainstay at Dragão, Paulinho scored his first goal in the main category of Brazilian football on 23 July 2017, netting the equalizer in a 1–1 home draw against Botafogo.

Paulinho signed for São Bento on 17 December 2018.

Career statistics

References

External links
 

1989 births
Living people
Footballers from São Paulo (state)
Brazilian footballers
Association football midfielders
Campeonato Brasileiro Série A players
Campeonato Brasileiro Série B players
Campeonato Brasileiro Série C players
Sport Club Internacional players
Figueirense FC players
Guarani FC players
Botafogo Futebol Clube (SP) players
Associação Atlética Ponte Preta players
Guaratinguetá Futebol players
Ituano FC players
Clube Náutico Capibaribe players
Criciúma Esporte Clube players
Paysandu Sport Club players
Mirassol Futebol Clube players
Atlético Clube Goianiense players
Esporte Clube São Bento players
Santa Cruz Futebol Clube players